Spartacus is an American historical epic series created by Steven S. DeKnight, who served as an executive producer alongside Sam Raimi and Rob Tapert. The series tells the story of a Thracian warrior who leads a rebellion against the Roman Republic. Initially the warrior, whose name is not given, agrees to fight alongside the Roman army to help defeat barbarians from a rival tribe, but he returns home to defend his village when a Roman general decides to abandon the warrior's village and ignore the barbarians to pursue glory elsewhere. Captured by the Romans as a deserter, his wife forced into slavery, the warrior is taken to Capua to be put to death by gladiators before the public. Here the warrior proves his worth as a fighter and is sent to the House of Batiatus to be trained as a gladiator, earning the name Spartacus (Batiatus names him after a 'legendary Thracian king'). The series premiered on the Starz Network on January 22, 2010 and aired its final episode on April 12. 2013.

For the first season, the role of Spartacus was played by Andy Whitfield, who was diagnosed with non-Hodgkin's lymphoma at the completion of the first season. Although in June 2010 Whitfield was reported to be healthy and cancer free, in September his cancer returned and he died on 11 September 2011.
Australian actor Liam McIntyre took over the role of Spartacus from Season 2. A total of 33 episodes of Spartacus were broadcast over three seasons. A six-part prequel miniseries entitled Spartacus: Gods of the Arena was also broadcast between Seasons 1 and 2 (in 2011).

Series overview

Episodes

Season 1: Blood and Sand (2010)

Prequel Season: Gods of the Arena (2011)

Season 2: Vengeance (2012)

Season 3: War of the Damned (2013)

Home media releases

References

External links 
 
 

Spartacus
Spartacus (TV series)